Albigny-sur-Saône (literally Albigny on Saône, commonly referred to as simply Albigny) is a commune in the Metropolis of Lyon in Auvergne-Rhône-Alpes region in eastern France. The town was established in Roman times around 40 BC over sacred ground of the Segusiavi tribe and likely re-named after Clodius Albinus in the early 3rd century AD.

An affluent community the town has two schools, including a Montessori bilingual French-English school, a public library, a church of the Roman Catholic Archdiocese of Lyon, a 12th century castle, two doctors, two dentists, a pharmacy, and a small shopping centre.

In 2020, Albigny had a population of approximately 3,000.

Surrounding communes
 Curis-au-Mont-d'Or
 Neuville-sur-Saône
 Couzon-au-Mont-d'Or

History 
On 1 January 2015 Albigny-sur-Saône left the department of Rhône to join the Metropolis of Lyon.

Population

See also
Lyon Metropolis

References

Communes of Lyon Metropolis
Lyonnais
Segusiavi